Conifer High School is a secondary school in Conifer, an unincorporated town located in the foothills of Jefferson County, southwest of Denver, Colorado, United States. The school is located about 20 minutes southwest of SH 470 and a short distance north of U.S. Highway 285.

History
Conifer High School opened in the fall of 1996  to serve students in the southern portion of what had previously been Evergreen High School's matriculation area. The area encompasses a large part of southwestern Jefferson County, including the communities of Aspen Park, Buffalo Creek, Pine, and Pine Junction, as well as parts of southern Evergreen and southwestern Morrison.

The land for the school campus was acquired in a county action of eminent domain, which gives landowners the choice of either a county purchase of the land or condemning the property. One parcel was a picnic area named "Rancho Lobo;" when it came time to choose a mascot, the vote decided upon the Lobos.

The opening of the school coincided with changes in the divisions of secondary, junior high, and elementary schools for the district. This meant that the first year of students consisted of eleventh grade students who had attended Evergreen High School during the previous year, and two classes of "freshmen" in ninth and tenth grade students from West Jefferson Middle School. The first year had no senior class; the first graduating class was in 1998.

In September 2014, the school gained notoriety when many teachers called in sick in response to pending actions by the Jefferson County School District. These included possible censorship of the AP US History curriculum as well as a lack of transparency in a new performance-based pay system for teachers. The following week, students and teachers at several other Jefferson County Schools joined in vocal response to the district.

Enrollment
Areas in the school's attendance boundary include: Indian Hills CDP.

Enrollment by grade in the 2013–2014 academic year:

Enrollment by race/ethnicity in the 2013–2014 academic year:

Enrollment by gender in the 2013–2014 academic year:

Campus

Community use
The building houses a substation of the Jefferson County Sheriff's Department. It also once housed a campus of Red Rocks Community College. This relationship with Red Rocks allowed students to take some college courses, after normal school hours, and receive both college and high school credit. As of 2007 Red Rocks no longer operates this campus.

Conifer High School shares its library with the Jefferson County Public Library system.  During school hours the library is restricted to school staff and students.  After school and on weekends the library is open to the public.  The public library is open six days a week, and is closed on Friday.

The building is also used for many events including health drives, holiday boutiques, and community festivals. During the wildfire season, the school has been used as a Red Cross shelter.

Architectural distinction
Designed by architectural firm LKA Partners, Conifer High School's architecture has been awarded several honors:
Project of Distinction, Council of Educational Facilities Planners, 1996
The James D. McConnell Award, Council of Educational Facilities Planners International, 1997
Citation Award, American Association of School Administrators, 1998

Extracurricular activities
Conifer High School is a member of the Colorado High School Activities Association (CHSAA) in District 4. It participates in activities in both the 3A classification and the 4A classification, situated between the 600 and 1400 student breakpoints for each of these classifications.

Athletics

Conifer High School students have the opportunity to participate in the following athletic activities under the Colorado High School Activities Association:

 Fall sports
 Football
 Men's soccer
 Women's/men's cross country
 Softball
 Men's tennis
 Volleyball
 Men's golf
 Winter sports
 Men's basketball
 Women's basketball
 Women's swimming and diving
 Wrestling
 Spring sports
 Baseball
 Women's tennis
 Men's lacrosse
 Women's lacrosse
 Men's swimming and diving
 Women's soccer
 Men's/women's track
 Women's golf

Gymnastics
In 2002 Rachael Lehmkuhl was the 4A State Gymnastics All Around Champion.

Softball
2003 Conifer High School's softball team won the 4A state championship.

Marching band
The 2006  Conifer High School marching band,  the Lobo Regiment, won the 3A state championship.

Faculty and staff
The following individuals have been principals of Conifer High School.

In the news
In May 2007, Conifer High School had a controversy over their yearbook, which included photographs and text depicting student alcohol and drug use.

References

External links
 

Educational institutions established in 1996
Public high schools in Colorado
Jefferson County Public Schools (Colorado)
Schools in Jefferson County, Colorado
1996 establishments in Colorado